Scott Patterson (born September 11, 1958) is an American actor. He is known for his role as Luke Danes in Gilmore Girls and as Peter Strahm in the Saw films. He also starred as Michael Buchanan in the NBC drama series The Event and as a Tenctonese alien commander in the TV film Alien Nation: Dark Horizon.

Early life 
Patterson was born September 11, 1958, in Philadelphia, Pennsylvania and raised in Haddonfield, New Jersey and attended Haddonfield Memorial High School, graduating in 1977, before attending Rutgers University, where he pursued a degree in Comparative Literature, before leaving college to play baseball. He studied acting in New York with renowned coaches Robert Lewis and Sondra Lee. He was exposed to the teachings of Paul Newman, Arthur Penn, and Frank Corsaro at the Actors Studio, where he also participated in the Producer's Unit chaired by Penn. He appeared in numerous productions, including Rasputin and Miss Julie.

Baseball career 

He played in two major league farm systems for seven different minor league teams and was selected to four all-star teams (two with Atlanta and two with the New York Yankees). Patterson was initially selected by the Atlanta Braves in the first round (12th overall) of the 1980 Major League Baseball secondary draft (an event distinct from the amateur draft). He played his first pro season with their Class A Anderson Braves in 1980. In 1981 Patterson won 13 consecutive games as a starting pitcher between Class A Durham and Double-A Savannah to set a Braves record for most consecutive wins to start a season. He was named the Braves Minor League Pitcher of the Month twice.

Patterson was traded from the Braves to the New York Yankees for Bob Watson on April 23, 1982, and was placed on the Yankees Major League roster in 1983. Patterson was named as an All-Star both with the Yankees' Double-A Albany-Colonie Yankees and Triple-A Columbus Clippers in 1986. In 1985 he was selected by the Texas Rangers in the Rule 5 draft but subsequently returned to the Yankees. While in the Yankees organization Patterson was named their minor league Pitcher of the Month once, and Pitcher of the Week three times. Patterson also pitched in the Puerto Rican Winter League with the Lobos de Arecibo in 1984–85, and the Dominican Professional Baseball League with Santo Domingo in 1985–86. Patterson signed a minor league contract with the Los Angeles Dodgers affiliate, the Albuquerque Dukes, in late 1986 but never played at the major league level.

Acting career 
In 1993, Patterson was slated to play the lead in Castle Rock's Little Big League opposite Sela Ward. The producers recast the role at the last minute with Revenge of the Nerds star Timothy Busfield, opting to offer Patterson the role of Mike McGrevey.

Patterson completed filming the leading role in the feature film Her Best Move, directed by Norm Hunter and co-starring Lisa Darr. He also appeared on the big screen in Little Big League, with Jason Robards, and in Three Wishes, with Patrick Swayze and Mary Elizabeth Mastrantonio. He also appeared in the independent films Highway 395 and Rhapsody in Bloom with Penelope Ann Miller and Ron Silver, Boys of Abu Ghraib with Sean Astin, and Other People's Children with Diane Marshall-Green.

On television, he has landed romantic roles; his most notable role, which he played for seven years on the television show Gilmore Girls, is Luke Danes, the backwards baseball cap-wearing on-again, off-again love interest of the show's protagonist, Lorelai Gilmore, played by Lauren Graham.

On Seinfeld, Patterson's character was deemed "spongeworthy" by Elaine (Julia Louis-Dreyfus). In the "Das Boob" episode of Will & Grace, his character had a profound effect on Grace (Debra Messing). Patterson also played the love interests of Jennifer Grey in It's Like, You Know and Sharon Lawrence's character in Fired Up. He has also appeared on Arli$$ and Get Real.

Among Patterson's recent projects are a co-starring role on Aliens in America and voicing the character of King Faraday in the 2004 animated series Justice League Unlimited, from Warner Bros. Animation. He has also starred as Agent Strahm in two iterations of the Saw franchise, Saw IV and Saw V, also appearing through flashback sequences in Saw VI.

Patterson appeared in some episodes of the second season of 90210 as Liam Court's ex-con father who has recently been released from prison and wants to reconnect with his son.

Patterson starred as Michael Buchanan in the NBC drama series The Event, which premiered on September 20, 2010. His character was killed off in episode 18.

In 2016, Patterson reprised his role as Luke Danes for the revival miniseries Gilmore Girls: A Year in the Life, which streamed on Netflix on November 25, 2016 and consisted of four 90-minute episodes featuring most of the original cast.

I Am All In podcast 
In 2021, Patterson partnered with I Heart Radio to launch the 'I Am All In' podcast dedicated to fans of Gilmore Girls. For the podcast, he watches an  episode and discusses the content with his producers and guests.

Filmography

Film

Television

References

External links 

 

1958 births
Albany-Colonie Yankees players
American male film actors
American male television actors
Anderson Braves players
Baseball players from New Jersey
Baseball players from Pennsylvania
Columbus Clippers players
Durham Bulls players
Haddonfield Memorial High School alumni
Living people
Nashville Sounds players
People from Haddonfield, New Jersey
Richmond Braves players
Savannah Braves players
Sportspeople from Camden County, New Jersey
20th-century American male actors
21st-century American male actors